Nigorigawa Dam  is a rockfill dam located in Hokkaido Prefecture in Japan. The dam is used for flood control. The catchment area of the dam is 14.3 km2. The dam impounds about 10  ha of land when full and can store 1048 thousand cubic meters of water. The construction of the dam was started on 1975 and completed in 2005.

References

Dams in Hokkaido